In the history of the Americas, the pre-Columbian era spans from the original settlement of North and South America in the Upper Paleolithic period through European colonization, which began with Christopher Columbus's voyage of 1492. Usually, the era covers the history of Indigenous cultures until significant influence by Europeans. This may have occurred decades or even centuries after Columbus for certain cultures.

Many pre-Columbian civilizations were marked by permanent settlements, cities, agriculture, civic and monumental architecture, major earthworks, and complex societal hierarchies. Some of these civilizations had long faded by the time of the first permanent European colonies (c. late 16th–early 17th centuries), and are known only through archaeological investigations and oral history. Other civilizations were contemporary with the colonial period and were described in European historical accounts of the time. A few, such as the Maya civilization, had their own written records. Because many Christian Europeans of the time viewed such texts as pagan, men like Diego de Landa burned them, even while seeking to preserve native histories. Only a few hidden documents have survived in their original languages, while others were transcribed or dictated into Spanish, giving modern historians glimpses of ancient culture and knowledge. 

Many Indigenous peoples in the Americas continue traditional practices while evolving and adapting to the modern world.

The alternative terms precontact, precolonial, or prehistoric Americas are also used; in Hispanic America, the usual term is pre-Hispanic; in Brazil, the term used is pre-Cabraline.

Historiography
Before the development of archaeology in the 19th century, historians of the pre-Columbian period mainly interpreted the records of the European conquerors and the accounts of early European travelers and antiquaries. It was not until the nineteenth century that the work of people such as John Lloyd Stephens, Eduard Seler and Alfred P. Maudslay, and of institutions such as the Peabody Museum of Archaeology and Ethnology of Harvard University, led to the reconsideration and criticism of the early European sources. Now, the scholarly study of pre-Columbian cultures is most often based on scientific and multidisciplinary methodologies.

Genetics

The haplogroup most commonly associated with Indigenous genetics is Haplogroup Q1a3a (Y-DNA). Researchers have found genetic evidence that the Q1a3a haplogroup has been in South America since at least 18,000 BC.Y-DNA, like mtDNA, differs from other nuclear chromosomes in that the majority of the Y chromosome is unique and does not recombine during meiosis. This has the effect that the historical pattern of mutations can easily be studied. The pattern indicates Indigenous peoples experienced two very distinctive genetic episodes: first with the initial peopling of the Americas and second with European colonization of the Americas. The former is the determinant factor for the number of gene lineages and founding haplotypes present in today's Indigenous populations.

Human settlement of the Americas occurred in stages from the Bering sea coast line, with an initial 20,000-year layover on Beringia for the founding population. The micro-satellite diversity and distributions of the Y lineage specific to South America indicates that certain Amerindian populations have been isolated since the initial colonization of the region. The Na-Dené, Inuit and Indigenous Alaskan populations exhibit haplogroup Q-M242 (Y-DNA) mutations, however, and are distinct from other Indigenous peoples with various mtDNA mutations. This suggests that the earliest migrants into the northern extremes of North America and Greenland derived from later populations.

Settlement of the Americas

Asian nomadic Paleo-Indians are thought to have entered the Americas via the Bering Land Bridge (Beringia), now the Bering Strait, and possibly along the coast. Genetic evidence found in Indigenous peoples' maternally inherited mitochondrial DNA (mtDNA) supports the theory of multiple genetic populations migrating from Asia. After crossing the land bridge, they moved southward along the Pacific coast and through an interior ice-free corridor. Over the course of millennia, Paleo-Indians spread throughout the rest of North and South America.

Exactly when the first people migrated into the Americas is the subject of much debate. One of the earliest identifiable cultures was the Clovis culture, with sites dating from some 13,000 years ago. However, older sites dating back to 20,000 years ago have been claimed. Some genetic studies estimate the colonization of the Americas dates from between 40,000 and 13,000 years ago.
The chronology of migration models is currently divided into two general approaches. The first is the short chronology theory with the first movement beyond Alaska into the Americas occurring no earlier than 14,000–17,000 years ago, followed by successive waves of immigrants. The second belief is the long chronology theory, which proposes that the first group of people entered the hemisphere at a much earlier date, possibly 50,000–40,000 years ago or earlier.

Artifacts have been found in both North and South America which have been dated to 14,000 years ago, and accordingly humans have been proposed to have reached Cape Horn at the southern tip of South America by this time. In that case, the Inuit would have arrived separately and at a much later date, probably no more than 2,000 years ago, moving across the ice from Siberia into Alaska.

North America

Lithic and Archaic periods

The North American climate was unstable as the ice age receded during the Lithic stage. It finally stabilized by about 10,000 years ago; climatic conditions were then very similar to today's. Within this time frame, roughly pertaining to the Archaic Period, numerous archaeological cultures have been identified.

Lithic stage and early Archaic period
The unstable climate led to widespread migration, with early Paleo-Indians soon spreading throughout the Americas, diversifying into many hundreds of culturally distinct tribes. The Paleo-Indians were hunter-gatherers, likely characterized by small, mobile bands consisting of approximately 20 to 50 members of an extended family. These groups moved from place to place as preferred resources were depleted and new supplies were sought. During much of the Paleo-Indian period, bands are thought to have subsisted primarily through hunting now-extinct giant land animals such as mastodon and ancient bison. Paleo-Indian groups carried a variety of tools, including distinctive projectile points and knives, as well as less distinctive butchering and hide-scraping implements.

The vastness of the North American continent, and the variety of its climates, ecology, vegetation, fauna, and landforms, led ancient peoples to coalesce into many distinct linguistic and cultural groups. This is reflected in the oral histories of the indigenous peoples, described by a wide range of traditional creation stories which often say that a given people have been living in a certain territory since the creation of the world.

Over the course of thousands of years, paleo-Indian people domesticated, bred and cultivated a number of plant species, including crops which now constitute 50–60% of worldwide agriculture. In general, Arctic, Subarctic, and coastal peoples continued to live as hunters and gatherers, while agriculture was adopted in more temperate and sheltered regions, permitting a dramatic rise in population.

Middle Archaic period
After the migration or migrations, it was several thousand years before the first complex societies arose, the earliest emerging about seven to eight thousand years ago. As early as 6500 BCE, people in the Lower Mississippi Valley at the Monte Sano site were building complex earthwork mounds, probably for religious purposes. This is the earliest dated of numerous mound complexes found in present-day Louisiana, Mississippi and Florida. Since the late twentieth century, archeologists have explored and dated these sites. They have found that they were built by hunter-gatherer societies, whose people occupied the sites on a seasonal basis, and who had not yet developed ceramics. Watson Brake, a large complex of eleven platform mounds, was constructed beginning 3400 BCE and added to over 500 years. This has changed earlier assumptions that complex construction arose only after societies had adopted agriculture, become sedentary, with stratified hierarchy and usually ceramics. These ancient people had organized to build complex mound projects under a different social structure.

Late Archaic period

Until the accurate dating of Watson Brake and similar sites, the oldest mound complex was thought to be Poverty Point, also located in the Lower Mississippi Valley. Built about 1500 BCE, it is the centerpiece of a culture extending over 100 sites on both sides of the Mississippi. The Poverty Point site has earthworks in the form of six concentric half-circles, divided by radial aisles, together with some mounds. The entire complex is nearly a mile across.

Mound building was continued by succeeding cultures, who built numerous sites in the middle Mississippi and Ohio River valleys as well, adding effigy mounds, conical and ridge mounds and other shapes.

Woodland period

The Woodland period of North American pre-Columbian cultures lasted from roughly 1000 BCE to 1000 CE. The term was coined in the 1930s and refers to prehistoric sites between the Archaic period and the Mississippian cultures. The Adena culture and the ensuing Hopewell tradition during this period built monumental earthwork architecture and established continent-spanning trade and exchange networks.

This period is considered a developmental stage without any massive changes in a short period, but instead having a continuous development in stone and bone tools, leatherworking, textile manufacture, tool production, cultivation, and shelter construction. Some Woodland peoples continued to use spears and atlatls until the end of the period, when they were replaced by bows and arrows.

Mississippian culture

The Mississippian culture was spread across the Southeast and Midwest from the Atlantic coast to the edge of the plains, from the Gulf of Mexico to the Upper Midwest, although most intensively in the area along the Mississippi River and Ohio River. One of the distinguishing features of this culture was the construction of complexes of large earthen mounds and grand plazas, continuing the moundbuilding traditions of earlier cultures. They grew maize and other crops intensively, participated in an extensive trade network and had a complex stratified society. The Mississippians first appeared around 1000 CE, following and developing out of the less agriculturally intensive and less centralized Woodland period. The largest urban site of these people, Cahokia—located near modern East St. Louis, Illinois—may have reached a population of over 20,000. Other chiefdoms were constructed throughout the Southeast, and its trade networks reached to the Great Lakes and the Gulf of Mexico. At its peak, between the 12th and 13th centuries, Cahokia was the most populous city in North America. (Larger cities did exist in Mesoamerica and South America.) Monk's Mound, the major ceremonial center of Cahokia, remains the largest earthen construction of the prehistoric Americas. The culture reached its peak in about 1200–1400 CE, and in most places, it seems to have been in decline before the arrival of Europeans.

Many Mississippian peoples were encountered by the expedition of Hernando de Soto in the 1540s, mostly with disastrous results for both sides. Unlike the Spanish expeditions in Mesoamerica, who conquered vast empires with relatively few men, the de Soto expedition wandered the American Southeast for four years, becoming more bedraggled, losing more men and equipment, and eventually arriving in Mexico as a fraction of its original size. The local people fared much worse though, as the fatalities of diseases introduced by the expedition devastated the populations and produced much social disruption. By the time Europeans returned a hundred years later, nearly all of the Mississippian groups had vanished, and vast swaths of their territory were virtually uninhabited.

Historic tribes
When the Europeans arrived, Indigenous peoples of North America had a wide range of lifeways from sedentary, agrarian societies to semi-nomadic hunter-gatherer societies. Many formed new tribes or confederations in response to European colonization. These are often classified by cultural regions, loosely based on geography. These can include the following:
 Arctic, including Aleut, Inuit, and Yupik peoples
 Subarctic
 Northeastern Woodlands
 Southeastern Woodlands
 Great Plains
 Great Basin
 Northwest Plateau
 Northwest Coast
 California
 Southwest (Oasisamerica)

Numerous pre-Columbian societies were sedentary, such as the Pueblo peoples, Mandan, Hidatsa and others, and some established large settlements, even cities, such as Cahokia, in what is now Illinois. The Iroquois League of Nations or "People of the Long House" was a politically advanced, democratic society, which is thought by some historians to have influenced the United States Constitution, with the Senate passing a resolution to this effect in 1988. Other historians have contested this interpretation and believe the impact was minimal, or did not exist, pointing to numerous differences between the two systems and the ample precedents for the constitution in European political thought.

Mesoamerica

Mesoamerica is the region extending from central Mexico south to the northwestern border of Costa Rica that gave rise to a group of stratified, culturally related agrarian civilizations spanning an approximately 3,000-year period before the visits to the Caribbean by Christopher Columbus. Mesoamerican is the adjective generally used to refer to that group of pre-Columbian cultures. This refers to an environmental area occupied by an assortment of ancient cultures that shared religious beliefs, art, architecture, and technology in the Americas for more than three thousand years.
Between 2000 and 300 BCE, complex cultures began to form in Mesoamerica. Some matured into advanced pre-Columbian Mesoamerican civilizations such as the Olmec, Teotihuacan, Maya, Zapotec, Mixtec, Huastec, Purepecha, Toltec, and Mexica/Aztecs. The Mexica civilization is also known as the Aztec Triple Alliance, since they were three smaller kingdoms loosely united together.

These Indigenous civilizations are credited with many inventions: building pyramid-temples, mathematics, astronomy, medicine, writing, highly accurate calendars, fine arts, intensive agriculture, engineering, an abacus calculator, and complex theology. They also invented the wheel, but it was used solely as a toy. In addition, they used native copper, silver and gold for metalworking.

Archaic inscriptions on rocks and rock walls all over northern Mexico (especially in the state of Nuevo León) demonstrate an early propensity for counting. Their number system was base 20 and included zero. These early count-markings were associated with astronomical events and underscore the influence that astronomical activities had upon Mesoamerican people before the arrival of Europeans. Many of the later Mesoamerican civilizations carefully built their cities and ceremonial centers according to specific astronomical events.

The biggest Mesoamerican cities, such as Teotihuacan, Tenochtitlan, and Cholula, were among the largest in the world. These cities grew as centers of commerce, ideas, ceremonies, and theology, and they radiated influence outwards onto neighboring cultures in central Mexico.

While many city-states, kingdoms, and empires competed with one another for power and prestige, Mesoamerica can be said to have had five major civilizations: the Olmec, Teotihuacan, the Toltec, the Mexica and the Maya. These civilizations (with the exception of the politically fragmented Maya) extended their reach across Mesoamerica—and beyond—like no others. They consolidated power and distributed influence in matters of trade, art, politics, technology, and theology. Other regional power players made economic and political alliances with these civilizations over the span of 4,000 years. Many made war with them, but almost all peoples found themselves within one of their spheres of influence.

Regional communications in ancient Mesoamerica have been the subject of considerable research. There is evidence of trade routes starting as far north as the Mexico Central Plateau, and going down to the Pacific coast. These trade routes and cultural contacts then went on as far as Central America. These networks operated with various interruptions from pre-Olmec times and up to the Late Classical Period (600–900 CE).

Olmec civilization

The earliest known civilization in Mesoamerica is the Olmec. This civilization established the cultural blueprint by which all succeeding indigenous civilizations would follow in Mexico. Pre-Olmec civilization began with the production of pottery in abundance, around 2300 BCE in the Grijalva River delta. Between 1600 and 1500 BCE, the Olmec civilization had begun, with the consolidation of power at their capital, a site today known as San Lorenzo Tenochtitlán near the coast in southeast Veracruz. The Olmec influence extended across Mexico, into Central America, and along the Gulf of Mexico. They transformed many peoples' thinking toward a new way of government, pyramid-temples, writing, astronomy, art, mathematics, economics, and religion. Their achievements paved the way for the Maya civilization and the civilizations in central Mexico.

Teotihuacan civilization

The decline of the Olmec resulted in a power vacuum in Mexico. Emerging from that vacuum was Teotihuacan, first settled in 300 BCE. By 150 CE, Teotihuacan had risen to become the first true metropolis of what is now called North America. Teotihuacan established a new economic and political order never before seen in Mexico. Its influence stretched across Mexico into Central America, founding new dynasties in the Maya cities of Tikal, Copan, and Kaminaljuyú. Teotihuacan's influence over the Maya civilization cannot be overstated: it transformed political power, artistic depictions, and the nature of economics. Within the city of Teotihuacan was a diverse and cosmopolitan population. Most of the regional ethnicities of Mexico were represented in the city, such as Zapotecs from the Oaxaca region. They lived in apartment communities where they worked their trades and contributed to the city's economic and cultural prowess. Teotihuacan's economic pull impacted areas in northern Mexico as well. It was a city whose monumental architecture reflected a monumental new era in Mexican civilization, declining in political power about 650 CE—but lasting in cultural influence for the better part of a millennium, to around 950 CE.

Tarascan/Purepecha civilization

Initially, the lands that would someday comprise the lands of the powerful Tarascan Empire were inhabited by several independent communities. Around 1300, however, the first Cazonci, Tariacuri, united these communities and built them into one of the most advanced civilizations in Mesoamerica. Their capital at Tzintzuntzan was just one of the many cities—there were ninety more under its control. The Tarascan Empire was among the largest in Central America, so it is no surprise that they routinely came into conflict with the neighboring Aztec Empire.
Out of all the civilizations in its area, the Tarascan Empire was the most prominent in metallurgy, harnessing copper, silver, and gold to create items such as tools, decorations, and even weapons and armor. Bronze was also used. The great victories over the Aztecs by the Tarascans cannot be understated. Nearly every war they fought in resulted in a Tarascan victory. Because the Tarascan Empire had little links to the former Toltec Empire, they were also quite independent in culture from their neighbors. The Aztecs, Tlaxcaltec, Olmec, Mixtec, Maya, and others were very similar to each other, however. This is because they were all directly preceded by the Toltecs, and they therefore shared almost identical cultures. The Tarascans, however, possessed a unique religion, as well as other things.

Maya civilization

Contemporary with Teotihuacan's greatness was that of the Maya civilization. The period between 250 CE and 650 CE was a time of intense flourishing of Maya civilized accomplishments. While the many Maya city-states never achieved political unity on the order of the central Mexican civilizations, they exerted a tremendous intellectual influence upon Mexico and Central America. The Maya built some of the most elaborate cities on the continent, and made innovations in mathematics, astronomy, and calendrics. The Maya also developed the only true writing system native to the Americas using pictographs and syllabic elements in the form of texts and codices inscribed on stone, pottery, wood, or perishable books made from bark paper.

Aztec/Mexica/Triple Alliance civilization

With the decline of the Toltec civilization came political fragmentation in the Valley of Mexico. Into this new political game of contenders to the Toltec throne stepped outsiders: the Mexica. They were also a desert people, one of seven groups who formerly called themselves "Azteca", in memory of Aztlán, but they changed their name after years of migrating. Since they were not from the Valley of Mexico, they were initially seen as crude and unrefined in the ways of Nahua civilization. Through political maneuvers and ferocious martial skill, they managed to rule Mexico as the head of the 'Triple Alliance' which included two other Aztec cities, Tetxcoco and Tlacopan.

Latecomers to Mexico's central plateau, the Mexica thought of themselves, nevertheless, as heirs of the civilizations that had preceded them. For them, arts, sculpture, architecture, engraving, feather-mosaic work, and the calendar, were bequest from the former inhabitants of Tula, the Toltecs.

The Mexica-Aztecs were the rulers of much of central Mexico by about 1400 (while Yaquis, Coras and Apaches commanded sizable regions of northern desert), having subjugated most of the other regional states by the 1470s. At their peak, the Valley of Mexico where the Aztec Empire presided, saw a population growth that included nearly 1 million people during the late Aztec period (1350–1519).

Their capital, Tenochtitlan, is the site of modern-day Mexico City. At its peak, it was one of the largest cities in the world with population estimates of 200,000–300,000. The market established there was the largest ever seen by the conquistadores on arrival.

South America 

By the first millennium, South America's vast rainforests, mountains, plains, and coasts were the home of millions of people. Estimates vary, but 30–50 million are often given and 100 million by some estimates. Some groups formed permanent settlements. Among those groups were Chibcha-speaking peoples ("Muisca" or "Muysca"), Valdivia, Quimbaya, Calima, Marajoara culture and the Tairona. The Muisca of Colombia, postdating the Herrera Period, Valdivia of Ecuador, the Quechuas and the Aymara of Peru and Bolivia were the four most important sedentary Amerindian groups in South America. From the 1970s, numerous geoglyphs have been discovered on deforested land in the Amazon rainforest, Brazil, supporting Spanish accounts of a complex, possibly ancient Amazonian civilization.

The theory of pre-Columbian contact across the South Pacific Ocean between South America and Polynesia has received support from several lines of evidence, although solid confirmation remains elusive. A diffusion by human agents has been put forward to explain the pre-Columbian presence in Oceania of several cultivated plant species native to South America, such as the bottle gourd (Lagenaria siceraria) or sweet potato (Ipomoea batatas). Direct archaeological evidence for such pre-Columbian contacts and transport has not emerged. Similarities noted in names of edible roots in Maori and Ecuadorian languages ("kumari") and Melanesian and Chilean ("gaddu") have been inconclusive.

A 2007 paper published in PNAS put forward DNA and archaeological evidence that domesticated chickens had been introduced into South America via Polynesia by late pre-Columbian times. These findings were challenged by a later study published in the same journal, that cast doubt on the dating calibration used and presented alternative mtDNA analyses that disagreed with a Polynesian genetic origin. The origin and dating remains an open issue. Whether or not early Polynesian–American exchanges occurred, no compelling human-genetic, archaeological, cultural or linguistic legacy of such contact has turned up.

Norte Chico civilization

On the north-central coast of present-day Peru, Norte Chico or Caral (as known in Peru) was a civilization that emerged around 3000 BCE (contemporary with urbanism's rise in Mesopotamia). It had a cluster of large-scale urban settlements of which the Sacred City of Caral, in the Supe valley, is one of the largest and best studied site. The civilization had no knowledge of machinery or pottery but still managed to develop trade, especially cotton and dehydrated fish. It was a hierarchical society that managed its ecosystems and had intercultural exchange. Its economy was heavily dependent on agriculture and fishing on the nearby coast. It is considered one of the cradles of civilization in the world and Caral is the oldest known civilization in the Americas.

Valdivia culture

The Valdivia culture was concentrated on the coast of Ecuador. Their existence was recently discovered by archeological findings. Their culture is among the oldest found in the Americas, spanning from 3500 to 1800 BCE. The Valdivia lived in a community of houses built in a circle or oval around a central plaza. They were sedentary people who lived off farming and fishing, though occasionally they hunted for deer. From the remains that have been found, scholars have determined that Valdivians cultivated maize, kidney beans, squash, cassava, chili peppers, and cotton plants, the last of which was used to make clothing. Valdivian pottery initially was rough and practical, but it became showy, delicate, and big over time. They generally used red and gray colors; and the polished dark red pottery is characteristic of the Valdivia period. In its ceramics and stone works, the Valdivia culture shows a progression from the most simple to much more complicated works.

Cañari people

The Cañari were the indigenous natives of today's Ecuadorian provinces of Cañar and Azuay. They were an elaborate civilization with advanced architecture and complex religious beliefs. The Inca destroyed and burned most of their remains. The Cañari's old city was replaced twice, first by the Incan city of Tumebamba and later on the same site by the colonial city of Cuenca. The city was also believed to be the site of El Dorado, the city of gold from the mythology of Colombia.

The Cañari were most notable for having repelled the Incan invasion with fierce resistance for many years until they fell to Tupac Yupanqui. Many of their descendants are still present in Cañar. The majority did not mix with the colonists or become Mestizos.

Chavín civilization

The Chavín, a Peruvian preliterate civilization, established a trade network and developed agriculture by 900 BCE, according to some estimates and archeological finds. The Chavín civilization spanned from 900 to 300 BCE.

Muisca people 

The Chibcha-speaking communities were the most numerous, the most territorially extended and the most socio-economically developed of the pre-Hispanic Colombians. By the 8th century, the indigenous people had established their civilization in the northern Andes. At one point, the Chibchas occupied part of what is now Panama, and the high plains of the Eastern Sierra of Colombia.

The areas which they occupied in Colombia were the present-day Departments of Santander (North and South), Boyacá and Cundinamarca. This is where the first farms and industries were developed. It is also where the independence movement originated. They are currently the richest areas in Colombia. The Chibcha developed the most populous zone between the Maya region and the Inca Empire. Next to the Quechua of Peru and the Aymara in Bolivia, the Chibcha of the eastern and north-eastern Highlands of Colombia developed the most notable culture among the sedentary Indigenous peoples in South America.

In the Colombian Andes, the Chibcha comprised several tribes who spoke similar languages (Chibcha). They included the following: the Muisca, Guane, Lache, Cofán, and Chitareros.

Moche civilization

The Moche thrived on the north coast of Peru from about 100 to 800 CE. The heritage of the Moche is seen in their elaborate burials. Some were recently excavated by UCLA's Christopher B. Donnan in association with the National Geographic Society.

As skilled artisans, the Moche were a technologically advanced people. They traded with distant peoples such as the Maya. What has been learned about the Moche is based on study of their ceramic pottery; the carvings reveal details of their daily lives. The Larco Museum of Lima, Peru, has an extensive collection of such ceramics. They show that the people practiced human sacrifice, had blood-drinking rituals, and that their religion incorporated non-procreative sexual practices (such as fellatio).

Tiwanaku Empire

The Tiwanaku empire was based in western Bolivia and extended into present-day Peru and Chile from 300 to 1000. Tiwanaku is recognized by Andean scholars as one of the most important South American civilizations prior to the birth of the Inca Empire in Peru; it was the ritual and administrative capital of a major state power for approximately five hundred years.

Inca Empire

Holding their capital at the great cougar-shaped city of Cusco, Peru, the Inca civilization dominated the Andes region from 1438 to 1533. Known as Tawantinsuyu, or "the land of the four regions", in Quechua, the Inca civilization was highly distinct and developed. Inca rule extended to nearly a hundred linguistic or ethnic communities, some 9 to 14 million people connected by a 40,000 kilometer road system. Cities were built with precise stonework, constructed over many levels of mountain terrain. Terrace farming was a useful form of agriculture. There is evidence of excellent metalwork and even successful brain surgery in Inca civilization.

Cambeba

Also known as the Omagua, Umana and Kambeba, the Cambeba are an indigenous people in Brazil's Amazon basin. The Cambeba were a populous, organized society in the late Pre-Columbian era whose population suffered steep decline in the early years of the Columbian Exchange. The Spanish explorer Francisco de Orellana traversed the Amazon River during the 16th century and reported densely populated regions running hundreds of kilometers along the river. These populations left no lasting monuments, possibly because they used local wood as their construction material as stone was not locally available. While it is possible Orellana may have exaggerated the level of development among the Amazonians, their semi-nomadic descendants have the odd distinction among tribal indigenous societies of a hereditary, yet landless, aristocracy. Archaeological evidence has revealed the continued presence of semi-domesticated orchards, as well as vast areas of land enriched with terra preta. Both of these discoveries, along with Cambeba ceramics discovered within the same archaeological levels suggest that a large and organized civilization existed in the area.

Agricultural development

Early inhabitants of the Americas developed agriculture, developing and breeding maize (corn) from ears  in length to the current size that are familiar today. Potatoes, tomatoes, tomatillos (a husked green tomato), pumpkins, chili peppers, squash, beans, pineapple, sweet potatoes, the grains quinoa and amaranth, cocoa beans, vanilla, onion, peanuts, strawberries, raspberries, blueberries, blackberries, papaya, and avocados were among other plants grown by natives. Over two-thirds of all types of food crops grown worldwide are native to the Americas.

Early Indigenous peoples began using fire in a widespread manner. Intentional burning of vegetation was taken up to mimic the effects of natural fires that tended to clear forest understories, thereby making travel easier and facilitating the growth of herbs and berry-producing plants that were important for both food and medicines. This created the Pre-Columbian savannas of North America.

While not as widespread as in other areas of the world (Asia, Africa, Europe), indigenous Americans did have livestock. Domesticated turkeys were common in Mesoamerica and in some regions of North America; they were valued for their meat, feathers, and, possibly, eggs. There is documentation of Mesoamericans utilizing hairless dogs, especially the Xoloitzcuintle breed, for their meat. Andean societies had llamas and alpacas for meat and wool, as well as for beasts of burden. Guinea pigs were raised for meat in the Andes. Iguanas and a range of wild animals, such as deer and pecari, were another source of meat in Mexico, Central, and northern South America.

By the 15th century, maize had been transmitted from Mexico and was being farmed in the Mississippi embayment, as far as the East Coast of the United States, and as far north as southern Canada. Potatoes were used by the Inca, and chocolate was used by the Aztecs.

See also

 1491: New Revelations of the Americas Before Columbus by Charles C. Mann
 Before the Revolution, 2013 book by Daniel K. Richter
 List of pre-Columbian cultures
 Metallurgy in pre-Columbian America
 Periodization of pre-Columbian Peru
 Population history of indigenous peoples of the Americas
 Pre-Columbian trans-oceanic contact theories

References

Bibliography

External links
 published on July 5, 2019, Quartz
Collection: "Pre-Columbian Central and South America" from the University of Michigan Museum of Art
Ancient American art at the Denver Art Museum
Art of the Americas at the Cleveland Museum of Art

 
 
Historical eras